Pres and Sweets is an album by American jazz saxophonist Lester Young and trumpeter Harry Edison recorded in 1955 and originally released on the Norgran label.

Reception

Allmusic awarded the album 4½ stars stating "it is not surprising that the music is quite swinging. Young was in good form that day, obviously happy to be having a reunion with his fellow Count Basie alumnus".

Track listing
 "Mean to Me" (Fred E. Ahlert, Roy Turk) - 7:14
 "Red Boy Blues" (Lester Young) - 5:11
 "Pennies from Heaven" (Arthur Johnston, Johnny Burke) - 5:14 	
 "That's All" (Alan Brandt, Bob Haymes) - 4:34
 "One O'Clock Jump" (Count Basie) - 5:17
 "She's Funny That Way" (Neil Moret, Richard A. Whiting) - 8:22
 "It's the Talk of the Town" (Jerry Livingston, Al J. Neiburg, Marty Symes) - 5:37 Bonus track on CD reissue
 "I Found a New Baby" (Jack Palmer, Spencer Williams) - 5:50 Bonus track on CD reissue

Personnel 
Lester Young - tenor saxophone
Harry Edison - trumpet
Oscar Peterson - piano
Herb Ellis - guitar
Ray Brown - bass
Buddy Rich - drums

References 

1955 albums
Lester Young albums
Harry Edison albums
Norgran Records albums
Verve Records albums
Albums produced by Norman Granz